Rear Admiral Gerald L. Ketchum (5 December 1908 – 22 August 1992) was a career officer in the United States Navy.  He served during World War II and the Korean War.  He was a recipient of the Silver Star and also participated in four expeditions to Antarctica.

Navy career
Gerald Lyle Ketchum was born in Bellingham, Washington on 5 December 1908 and graduated from the United States Naval Academy in 1931.

World War II
During World War II Ketchum was a lieutenant commander and was placed in command of the destroyer USS Perkins (DD-377) on 1 March 1943.  The Perkins was employed in operations in the waters off New Guinea.

On 22 September 1943, during an operation in which his ship was assigned to screen a convoy of landing craft, Ketchum and the Perkins engaged ten attacking Japanese torpedo planes.  Ketchum positioned the Perkins between the planes and the convoy, and despite being heavily strafed, simultaneously avoided two torpedoes by skillful maneuvering, shot down one torpedo plane, and assisted in the destruction of another.  For this action he was later awarded the Silver Star – the Navy's third highest award for heroism.

In the early morning hours of 29 November 1943, the Perkins was rammed by an Australian troopship and sank with the loss of nine American lives.  Ketchum was held accountable for the incident by a board of inquiry and, unlike most naval officers whose ships have a collision under their command, he was allowed to command ships later in his career.

Antarctic expeditions
On 28 December 1946, Ketchum became the commanding officer of newly commissioned icebreaker USS Burton Island (AG-88).  The Burton Island served in Task Group 68.2 during Operation Highjump, the United States Navy Antarctic Developments Program 1946–1947; also known as the Fourth Byrd Anatarctic Expedition.  This was the Navy's first Antarctic expedition involving a large number of ships of various kinds and helped established the feasibility of sustained operations in the Antarctic.
   
He was also Commander of "Task Force 39" consisting of two ships, the Burton Island and the USS Edisto (AG-89), and 500 men for Operation Windmill, an Antarctic expedition in 1947–1948.  Ketchum relinquished command of the Burton Island on 22 September 1947.

Ketchum returned to the Antarctic again when he served as Deputy Commander, United States Naval Support Force, Antarctica, during Operations Deep Freeze I and II from 1 February 1955 to 22 March 1957.   He was responsible for and directly supervised the preparation and implementation of plans for the two Antarctic expeditions.  This involved the design, establishment, and operation of seven widely dispersed bases constructed to support the Antarctic program of the United States National Committee for the International Geophysical Year.

He assumed command of Task Force units from 10 December 1955 to 3 February 1956 during Operation Deep Freeze I, when he skillfully directed aircraft and ship units in hazardous and difficult operations. During Operation Deep Freeze II, he assumed command of the Task Force from 14 September to 20 December 1956, during which period he conducted through the dangerous Antarctic ice pack without damage the largest convoy of ships ever deployed to the Antarctic. From 14 January to 27 February 1957, he assumed command of a task group of three ships and established a base on the Knox Coast under extremely adverse ice conditions.  For his service in these operations, Ketchum received the Legion of Merit.

Retirement and death
Upon his retirement from the Navy he was promoted to the rank of rear admiral in recognition of his wartime service.  He died in Plano, Texas on 22 August 1992.

Legacy
Ketchum Ridge in Antarctica is named after him.

Awards
Silver Star
Legion of Merit
Navy Commendation Medal with "V" device
American Defense Service Medal
American Campaign Medal with "FLEET" clasp
Asiatic-Pacific Campaign Medal with four battle stars
World War II Victory Medal
National Defense Service Medal
Korea Service Medal
Antarctic Service Medal with three service stars
United Nations Korea Medal

Silver Star citation
The President of the United States of America takes pleasure in presenting the Silver Star to Lieutenant Commander Gerald Lyle Ketchum (NSN: 0-70240), United States Navy, for gallantry and intrepidity in action against the enemy. While Commanding Officer of the Destroyer U.S.S. PERKINS (DD-377), on 22 September 1943, during an operation in which his ship was assigned to screen a convoy of landing craft, he assisted in meeting, repelling and destroying a vicious enemy air attack launched by ten torpedo planes. He quickly and efficiently brought his ship into action, taking station between the planes and the defenseless convoy, and while being heavily strafed, simultaneously avoided two torpedoes by skillful maneuvering, kept all batteries in action, shot down one torpedo plane, and assisted in the destruction of another. His actions and conduct were in keeping with the highest traditions of the United States Naval Service.

Legion of Merit citation
The President of the United States of America takes pleasure in presenting the Legion of Merit to Captain Gerald Lyle Ketchum (NSN: 0-70240), United States Navy, for exceptionally meritorious conduct in the performance of outstanding services to the Government of the United States as Deputy Commander, United States Naval Support Force, Antarctica, during Operation DEEP FREEZE I and II from 1 February 1955 to 22 March 1957. An extremely competent and resourceful leader, Captain Ketchum has been responsible for and has directly supervised the preparation and implementation of plans for two Antarctic expeditions which involved the design, establishment, and operation of seven widely dispersed bases constructed to support the Antarctic program of the United States National Committee for the International Geophysical Year. Assuming command of Task Force units from 10 December 1955 to 3 February 1956 during Operation DEEP FREEZE I, he skillfully directed aircraft and ship units in hazardous and difficult operations. During Operation DEEP FREEZE II, he assumed command of the Task Force from 14 September to 20 December 1956, during which period he conducted through the dangerous Antarctic ice pack without damage the largest convoy of ships ever deployed to the Antarctic. From 14 January to 27 February 1957, he assumed command of a task group of three ships and established a base on the Knox Coast under extremely adverse ice conditions. By his outstanding leadership, judgment and inspiring devotion to duty throughout, Captain Ketchum upheld the highest traditions of the United States Naval Service.

General Orders: Board Serial 895 (4 December 1957)

Action Date: 1 February 1955 – 22 March 1957

References

1908 births
1992 deaths
People from Bellingham, Washington
Explorers of Antarctica
American polar explorers
20th-century explorers
United States and the Antarctic
United States Naval Academy alumni
Military personnel from Washington (state)
Recipients of the Silver Star
Recipients of the Legion of Merit